Xie Qimei (born 1923 in Wujin District, Changzhou, Jiangsu), is a Chinese diplomat. He was the Under-Secretary-General of United Nations from 1985 to 1991.

Biography
Xie received his bachelor's degree of Math from National Central University in 1947. He started teaching in National Central University and Tsinghua University. Xie became translator and staff member of the Chinese Ministry of Foreign Affairs after the People's Republic of China established in 1949. In 1973, when United States and China set up the liaison office with each other, Xie was dispatched to United States and worked in the office as culture counselor. He continued working in US after both country establish the official relationship. He then worked at Chinese Ministry of Foreign Affairs and Permanent Mission of the PRC to the United Nations, until being appointed as Under-Secretary-General of UN in June 1985.

From 1992 to 2002, Xie was the president of UN Association of China.

Publications 
 China And United Nations;
 Facing the United Nations in 21st Century;

References

1923 births
Nanjing University alumni
Academic staff of the National Central University
Living people
People from Wujin District
Educators from Changzhou
Diplomats of the People's Republic of China
Chinese non-fiction writers
Writers from Changzhou
Chinese expatriates in the United States